The Mid-American Conference baseball tournament is the conference baseball championship of the Mid-American Conference, Division I members of the National Collegiate Athletic Association (NCAA).  Since 2022, the top four finishers participate in the double-elimination tournament, which is played at the home field of the top seed. The winner of the tournament receives an automatic berth to the NCAA Division I Baseball Championship.  The tournament began in 1981, but was not held from 1984 through 1991. It returned in 1992 and was held annually through 2019. It was scheduled to be played in May 2020, but was cancelled in March 2020 due to the coronavirus pandemic. As part of several changes announced in May 2020 related to the pandemic, the tournament was eliminated along with the post-season tournaments of seven other sports, for at least four seasons. The tournament, however, returned in May 2022 after the conference announced in May 2021 that the baseball tournament, along with all other conference tournaments that had been eliminated, would be restored for the 2021–22 athletic season. Kent State has won the most tournament titles with 12, followed by Central Michigan and Eastern Michigan with four each.

Format and location
The MAC baseball tournament is held in mid to late May at the conclusion of the regular season. Beginning with the 2022 tournament, the format returned to its original setup with the top four teams from the regular season playing in a double-elimination bracket, hosted by the top seed. This format was also used from the tournament's inception 1981 through 1983 and again when it was revived in 1992 through 1997.  The 1992 tournament was also when All-Tournament Team and Most Valuable Player were instituted.  Beginning in 1998, the conference was divided into East and West divisions for the regular season and the tournament format was expanded to a six-team field in a double-elimination bracket, with the top three finishers from each division qualifying. In 2001, the format changed from the top three in each division to the top six overall. Beginning in 2008, the tournament was changed to an eight-team, double-elimination field and moved to a neutral site, first to V.A. Memorial Stadium in Chillicothe, Ohio from 2008 through 2011, followed by All Pro Freight Stadium in Avon, Ohio, where it remained through 2019 and was scheduled to be held in 2020. The number of teams remained constant through the 2017 tournament, but was reduced back to six teams for the 2018 and 2019 tournaments following the loss of Akron in 2015 and Buffalo in 2017. The separate divisions were also eliminated after the 2017 season.

Champions

By year
The following is a list of tournament champions and sites listed by year.

By school
The following is a list of tournament champions listed by school and the years each team was eligible to play in the tournament.

Former conference members shaded in ██ silver

References